Farhiya Abdi (born May 31, 1992) is a Somali-Swedish professional basketball player. She has also played overseas since 2016.

Career
Abdi was born in 1992 in Sweden. Her parents are Somali migrants.

Abdi initially played for Frisco Brno in the Czech Republic basketball league. In 2012, she joined the Los Angeles Sparks after being drafted with the first pick of the second round of the 2012 WNBA draft. She was the first Somali to play in the WNBA.

Abdi played three seasons in the WNBA, all with the Sparks. She played in one playoff game in her career as part of the 2014 playoffs.

She also competed in EuroLeague Women for Perfumerias Avenida Salamanca in 2017-18 and in EuroCup Women for Maccabi Bnot Ashdod in 2016-17 and for Galatasaray in 2018-19.

References

1992 births
Living people
Ethnic Somali people
Forwards (basketball)
Los Angeles Sparks players
Los Angeles Sparks draft picks
Swedish people of Somali descent
Swedish women's basketball players
Swedish expatriate basketball people in the United States
Galatasaray S.K. (women's basketball) players